This is a list of Spanish television related events in 1994.

Events 
 14 February: Teledeporte, first sports channel owned by TVE, is launched through Hispasat.
 16 April: For the first time a private TV channel, Antena 3 gets higher monthly audience share than the State-owned La 1.
 25 November: TV Show El primijuego, (TVE), hosted by Teresa Viejo offers the highest prize in Spanish Television History, 100.000.000 pesetas (601.012€).

Debuts

Television shows

Ending this year

Foreign series debuts in Spain

Births 
 22 February - Yaiza Esteve, actress.
 25 February - Ricardo Gómez, actor.

Deaths 
 9 March - Fernando Rey, actor, 76
 4 September - Sonia Martínez, hostess, 30
 19 September - Alberto Closas, actor, 72
 23 September - Yale, journalist, 64
 18 October - Conchita Montes, actress, 80
 23 November - Félix Rotaeta, actor, 52
 28 December - Mariano Medina, meteorólogo, 72

See also 
List of Spanish films of 1994

References 

1994 in Spanish television